WGRA (790 AM) is a radio station broadcasting a talk radio format. Licensed to Cairo, Georgia, United States, the station is currently owned by Lovett Broadcasting Enterprises. In August 2020, the station can now also be heard on an FM translator at 95.9FM.

References

External links

GRA